Marc Baecke (24 July 1956 – 21 January 2017) was a Belgian footballer who played as a left back.

Club career
During his career he played for Beveren, with whom he won two league titles and two Belgian Cups, only to finish his career with two seasons at Kortrijk.

International career
He earned 15 caps for the Belgium national football team, and participated in the 1982 FIFA World Cup and UEFA Euro 1984.

Personal life
He was said to suffer from Buerger disease and his left leg was removed after he suffered an infection from an open wound in December 2013.

Death
Baecke died in January 2017 after a long illness.

References

External links
 
Royal Belgian Football Association: Number of caps

1956 births
2017 deaths
Sportspeople from Sint-Niklaas
Footballers from East Flanders
Association football fullbacks
Belgian footballers
Belgium international footballers
1982 FIFA World Cup players
UEFA Euro 1984 players
K.S.K. Beveren players
K.V. Kortrijk players